R. Donovan "Don" Munford was a  Republican member of the North Carolina General Assembly representing the state's thirty-fourth House district, including constituents in Wake County from 2002.  Munford is a lawyer and accountant from Raleigh, North Carolina.

Munford ran for re-election to the North Carolina House of Representatives in the 2004.  He defeated J.H. Ross in the Republican primary, but lost to Democrat Grier Martin in the general election.

He is a partner at Smith Anderson, the largest law firm in the Raleigh area.  He practices in the areas of corporate and business law, estate planning and asset protection planning.  Munford is also a licensed Certified Public Accountant.

References

External links

Republican Party members of the North Carolina House of Representatives
Living people
Year of birth missing (living people)
21st-century American politicians